The Chilean grape scare was a 1989 incident involving two grapes from Chile allegedly found tainted with cyanide after a threat was supposedly made by phone to the US Embassy in Santiago. No additional contaminated fruit was found, but the United States Food and Drug Administration banned the import of Chilean fruit and warned people not to eat grapes or Chilean fruit despite the fact investigators found no traces of cyanide in any other fruit shipped from Chile to Philadelphia.

The scare
The individual who supposedly telephoned the U.S. embassy in Santiago on March 2 told them some Chilean grapes contained cyanide. No individual or group ever claimed responsibility for poisoning the two grapes or making the phone call. Just two grapes were said to have been injected with cyanide and the country's fruit export sector was thrown into panic.  Table grapes are the leading Chilean agricultural export to the United States. Thousands of farm workers lost their jobs and the Government was forced to provide temporary subsidies to offset the more than $400 million in losses.

The doubts
Because cyanide is highly reactive and the fact that a punctured grape decomposes rapidly, it is not possible for a grape to be injected with cyanide (or anything else for that matter) and arrive in the U.S. intact, two to three weeks later.  This fact led the GAO (General Accounting Office) to investigate to determine whether the scare was a result of poor laboratory processes.  The investigation was inconclusive.

The Military Chilean government, without evidence, blamed the contamination scare on the work of local Marxist extremists. However, this Engels report which also discusses the only post-Democratic Chilean government report dismisses the Military Government's accusations of any Marxist sabotage, and instead concludes that the FDA and US State Department either conspired to harm elements in Chile or the FDA director had an unprecedented over-reaction--which President George H. W. Bush promoted. In either case, Engels concludes the US response was a violation of international trade agreements, and thus Chile was justified in suing the US FDA for more than $200m. The Engels report concludes California competitors did not play a role in what was likely a hoax according to US-based statistical analyses. The Engels report further suggests the George H. W. Bush administration attempted to influence the Chilean election, but does not provide evidence and shifts emphasis instead to free-trade issues and a legal case against the US.  Thus, evidence of US economic sabotage is established in Engels, but definitive evidence of a political motive is lacking from the Engels report. The Engels report doubts fumigation prior to shipping for export could have been the source of the trace amounts actually detected, even though some standard fumigation agents in used contained cyanide.  
Engels concludes there was foul play, while a contemporaneous article suggests a hoax.

References

http://www.fortfreedom.org/l28.htm
The Cyanide Scare; a Tale of Two Grapes

1989 health disasters
1989 in Chile
1989 in international relations
Chile–United States relations
1989
Food scares
1989